Matts Olsson (born 1 December 1988) is a Swedish former World Cup alpine ski racer who raced in the giant slalom discipline.

Born in Karlstad, Olsson made his World Cup debut at age 19 in October 2007. He won a bronze medal at the 2011 World Championships in the team event, and finished 18th in the giant slalom, and 24th in the super-G.

Matts Olsson won his first World Cup competition victory in Alta Badia in December 2017 at an evening event in Parallel Giant Slalom. Olsson defeated Marcel Hirscher in the semi-final and Henrik Kristoffersen in the final. The victory was Sweden's first World Cup win in Parallel Giant Slalom.

On 14 March 2020, Olsson announced his retirement from the sport following the 2019–2020 season.

World cup results

Season standings

Race podiums
 1 win – (1 PG)
 4 podiums – (3 GS, 1 PG)

World Championships results

Olympic results

References

External links

 
 Matts Olsson World Cup standings at the International Ski Federation
 
 
 Swedish Olympic Committee (SOK) – Matts Olsson
 Head.com – athletes – alpine skiing – Matts Olsson

1988 births
Swedish male alpine skiers
Alpine skiers at the 2014 Winter Olympics
Alpine skiers at the 2018 Winter Olympics
Olympic alpine skiers of Sweden
Sportspeople from Karlstad
Living people